Paolo Ranno (born 23 February 1966) is an Italian sports shooter. He competed in the men's 10 metre air pistol event at the 2000 Summer Olympics.

References

1966 births
Living people
Italian male sport shooters
Olympic shooters of Italy
Shooters at the 2000 Summer Olympics